Sexto Sentido is the twenty-fourth (24th) studio album by Puerto Rican singer Yolandita Monge. It was released in 2002 by Warner Music Latina and almost all its tracks were produced by Kike Santander.  It marked the first time that the singer officially collaborated in an album with her daughter Noelia in the tracks "Te Vine A Buscar" and "La Luna".

The song 'La Luna' is the Spanish translation of the song by the same name originally recorded by Belinda Carlisle in 1989.  Monge's daughter Noelia co-wrote it and also sings backup vocals on the track.  The singer is featured in a video for the track "Te Vine A Buscar" with all of her children in the recording studio.  After this release, the singer went on a lengthy five-year hiatus to focus on her acting career and to host the Variety TV show De Mujeres in Puerto Rico.

The album is currently out of print in all formats.  This release has never been available as a digital download.

Track listing

Notes

Track listing and credits from album booklet.

Charts

Albums

Singles charts

References

Yolandita Monge albums
2002 albums